Land of Dreams is a 1988 studio album by Randy Newman featuring vignettes of his childhood in New Orleans.

Reception
It placed 10th in the 1988 Pazz & Jop Critics Poll. "Whether or not ['Dixie Flyer' and 'New Orleans'] are simple autobiography, they're presented as such," wrote Greil Marcus, "and for a man who's always sung as a character actor, it's a shock". While "Dixie Flyer" was the name of the train line mentioned in the lyrics, "Dixie" was also the nickname of Adele "Dixie" Fuchs/Fox, Randy Newman's mother, who, as the song describes, came from a southern Jewish family.

Chart performance
The album's single "It's Money That Matters" rose to the top of the Mainstream Rock chart for two weeks (and peaked at #60 on the Hot 100), to become Newman's only number one hit on any U.S. chart; it features Mark Knopfler on guitar. Prior to the album's release, the song "Something Special" was closing title music for the 1987 MGM production Overboard starring Goldie Hawn and Kurt Russell and was also featured in the trailer of the film Awakenings, for which Newman also wrote the music, and the piano bridge from the song "Dixie Flyer" would subsequently often be utilized as break or filler music, most notably on the Car Talk radio program. The song "Falling in Love" features in the credits to the 1989 Tom Selleck film Her Alibi and was used as the opening theme of the short-lived 1990 ABC sitcom, The Marshall Chronicles.

Track listing
All songs written by Randy Newman.

 "Dixie Flyer" – 4:10
 "New Orleans Wins the War" – 3:27
 "Four Eyes" – 3:34
 "Falling in Love" – 3:00
 "Something Special" – 3:07
 "Bad News from Home" – 2:45
 "Roll with the Punches" – 3:29
 "Masterman and Baby J" – 3:27
 "Red Bandana" – 2:35
 "Follow the Flag" – 2:15
 "It's Money That Matters" – 4:04
 "I Want You to Hurt Like I Do" – 4:07

Personnel
 Randy Newman – piano, vocals, arranger, conductor
 Mark Knopfler – guitar and background vocals on "Dixie Flyer"
 Tom Petty – guitar, background vocals
 Dean Parks, Buzz Feiten, Steve Lukather, Michael Landau, Mike Campbell – guitar
 Lee Sklar, Nathan East, Neil Stubenhaus – bass guitar
 Jeff Lynne – keyboards, background vocals
 James Newton Howard – synthesizer, keyboards
 David Paich, Guy Fletcher, Larry Fast, Michael Boddicker, Robbie Weaver – synthesizer
 Kevin Maloney – synthesizer, background vocals
 Phil Jones - Drums and Percussion on 'Falling in Love'
 Carlos Vega, Phil Jones, Jeff Porcaro, John Robinson – drums
 Lenny Castro – percussion
 Bill Reichenbach Jr. – trombone
 Marc Russo – saxophone
 Dan Higgins – flute, tenor saxophone
 Jerry Hey – trumpet, flugelhorn
 Twila Rice, Bob Hilburn Jr., Nicole Jones, Karen Verkoelen, Jeannie Novak, Adrienne Howell, Dana Drum, Deborah Neal – background vocals

Charts

References

1988 albums
Randy Newman albums
Albums produced by Mark Knopfler
Albums produced by Jeff Lynne
Albums produced by Tommy LiPuma
Reprise Records albums
Albums arranged by Randy Newman
Albums conducted by Randy Newman